Richard Dean Grove (1927 – December 26, 1998) was an American musician, composer, arranger, and educator. He is best known as the founder of the Dick Grove School of Music. Its students include Michael Jackson, Linda Ronstadt, and Barry Manilow, and its teachers Henry Mancini, Bill Conti, and Lalo Schifrin.

Grove was born in Lakeville, Indiana. At the University of Denver he studied music and then taught piano locally. In 1957 he moved to Los Angeles and taught at the Westlake School of Music. Westlake concentrated on the Schillinger System, which served as a basis for the first curricula at Berklee School of Music (which was called the Schillinger House of Music). In his Composing & Arranging Program, he mentions that he studied the Schillinger System for nine years.

He established the Dick Grove School of Music in Los Angeles in 1973. After the school closed in 1991, he established the Grove School Without Walls, a distance-learning school where he taught Musicianship and Modern Harmony, Composing and Arranging, and Jazz Keyboard via a series of books and accompanying videos and DVDs.

While operating the Grove School and the School without Walls, Grove published many books on musicianship, jazz harmony, ear training, improvisation, composing, and arranging as related to contemporary styles of music. He pioneered innovative concepts such as tying the study of chord symbols, jazz harmony and chord-scale-theory to ear training by using movable do solfege; the concept of chord families to organize all possible chords (including all extended chords); the concept of plural interior chords and "assumed roots" within a chord family, which is instrumental in systematically organizing slash chords, polychords, and "upper structure" voicings used in jazz; the "grid" concept, an expanded circle of fifths that helps to visualize and analyze chord progressions moving through different momentary keys) according to criteria of good voice leading; the concept of "shapes" as a systematic approach to understanding voicings, a comprehensive approach to jazz harmonization and reharmonization.

As a jazz pianist, Grove worked with Alvino Rey, Paul Horn, Buddy Rich, and Nancy Wilson.

References

External links
 Official site

1927 births
1998 deaths
Musicians from Indiana
American jazz musicians
American music educators
University of Denver alumni